Esan or ESAN may refer to:
Dayo ighodalo

Nigeria
 Esan people, an ethnic group of southern Nigeria
 Esan language, an Edoid language spoken by the Esan people
 Esanland, a cultural region and senatorial district of Nigeria, where the Esan people live
 Esan Central, LGA in Nigeria
 Esan North-East, LGA in Nigeria
 Esan South-East, LGA in Nigeria
 Esan West, LGA in Nigeria

Other countries
 Esan, Hokkaido, a former town in Japan now part of Hakodate, Hokkaido
 Mount Esan, a volcano in Hakodate, Hokkaido
 ESAN University, a university in Lima, Peru
 Isan, also known as Esan, a region of Thailand

Language and nationality disambiguation pages